Gerold Huber (born 1969) is a German classical pianist, best known as the regular duo partner of baritone Christian Gerhaher and accompanist of other singers.

Career 

Together with the singer Christian Gerhaher he attended a master class with Dietrich Fischer-Dieskau in Berlin.

Huber forms a duo with Christian Gerhaher and has also accompanied singers such as Ruth Ziesak, Franz-Josef Selig, Bernarda Fink, Cornelia Kallisch and Diana Damrau. He is the pianist of the "Liedertafel" founded in 2002 of James Taylor, Christian Elsner, Michael Volle and Franz-Josef Selig and has appeared with the Artemis Quartet.

Awards 

 2006 Gramophone Award 2006 for "" with Christian Gerhaher
 2001 
 1998 Prix International Pro Musicis Paris/New York with Christian Gerhaher

Recordings 

 Ludwig van Beethoven: , Russki Record München
 Johannes Brahms: , Franz Schubert:  and various , Frank Martin: , Christian Gerhaher, Arte Nova, August 2002
 Joseph Haydn: , Ruth Ziesak, Capriccio 
 Erich Kästner / Edmund Nick: , chansons, Susanne Brantl, Russki Record München
 Erich Kästner / Edmund Nick: , chansons, Susanne Brantl, Russki Record München
 Gustav Mahler: , Christian Gerhaher, Hyperion Ensemble, Arte Nova, February 2003
 Franz Schubert: , Christian Gerhaher, ARTE NOVA
 Franz Schubert: , Christian Gerhaher, ARTE NOVA
 Franz Schubert: , Christian Gerhaher, ARTE NOVA
 Franz Schubert:  (various Lieder), Christian Gerhaher, RCA, January 2006
 Franz Schubert: , Bernarda Fink, Harmonia Mundi 
 Robert Schumann: , Christian Gerhaher, RCA, March 2008
 Robert Schumann: , Christian Gerhaher, RCA, October 2004
 Terezín|Theresienstadt, Lieder by Victor Ullmann and others, Anne Sofie von Otter, Christian Gerhaher, Deutsche Grammophon, 2007
 , Schubert, Mendelssohn, Schumann, Silcher, "Liedertafel", ORFEO

References

External links
 
 Gerold Huber on the Gasteig website
 Entries for recordings by Gerold Huber on WorldCat

German classical pianists
Male classical pianists
University of Music and Performing Arts Munich alumni
1969 births
Living people
21st-century classical pianists
People from Straubing
21st-century male musicians